Desert Valley may refer to:

Places
 Desert Valley Hospital, San Bernardino County, California
 Indus Valley Desert
 Virgin Valley Heritage Museum, formerly known as the Desert Valley Museum

Organizations
 Desert Valley Charitable Foundation, founded in 1989
 Desert Valley Elementary School. See Peoria Unified School District
 Desert Star Weekly, an independent alternative weekly newspaper

Sports
 Desert Valley League, Riverside County, California 
 Desert Valley Mountain Lions

Other 
 Desert Valley (film), a 1926 American silent Western film